Field Marshal Sir Patrick Grant,  (11 September 1804 – 28 March 1895) was a senior Indian Army officer. He fought at the Battle of Maharajpore during the Gwalior campaign, at the Battle of Mudki, the Battle of Ferozeshah and the Battle of Sobraon during the First Anglo-Sikh War and at the Battle of Chillianwala and the Battle of Gujrat during the Second Anglo-Sikh War. During the Indian Mutiny, as acting Commander-in-Chief, India, he directed the operations against the mutineers, sending forces under Henry Havelock and James Outram for the relief of Cawnpore and Lucknow. He later became Governor of Malta.

Military career
Born the second son of Major John Grant of the 97th Regiment of Foot and Anna Trapaud Grant, Grant joined the Bengal Native Infantry as an ensign on 16 July 1820 and was promoted to lieutenant on 11 July 1823 and to captain on 14 May 1832. He became a brigade major in Oudh in 1834 and, having raised the Hariana Light Infantry in 1836, he became second assistant in the adjutant-general's department of the Bengal Presidency in 1838.

Grant served under Sir Hugh Gough as deputy assistant adjutant-general at the Battle of Maharajpore in December 1843 during the Gwalior campaign. Promoted to brevet major on 30 April 1844, he served as acting adjutant-general of the army at the Battle of Mudki in December 1845 (where he was twice wounded), at the Battle of Ferozeshah also in December 1845 and at the Battle of Sobraon in February 1846 during the First Anglo-Sikh War. He became deputy adjutant-general of the Bengal Army in March 1846 and was promoted to brevet lieutenant colonel on 3 April 1846.

Grant also took part in the Battle of Chillianwala in January 1849 and the Battle of Gujrat in February 1849 during the Second Anglo-Sikh War. He later served under Sir Charles Napier in operations against the Pathan tribes in Kohat in 1850. Appointed aide-de-camp to the Queen and promoted to brevet colonel on 2 August 1850, he was further promoted to brevet major-general on 28 November 1854 before becoming commander-in-chief of the Madras Army with the local rank of lieutenant-general on 25 January 1856.

When General George Anson died of cholera on his march against the mutineers in May 1857, Grant, as senior commander in India, was summoned to Calcutta to become acting Commander-in-Chief, India. From Calcutta he directed the operations against the mutineers, sending forces under Henry Havelock and James Outram for the relief of Cawnpore and Lucknow. Although the Viceroy of India, Lord Canning, had recommended that Grant be confirmed in the role of commander-in-chief, Sir Colin Campbell had already been nominated as Anson's successor. So on the arrival of Campbell from England in August 1857, Grant returned to command the Madras Army again.

Grant returned to England in January 1861 and was promoted to the substantive rank of colonel on 14 November 1861 and to lieutenant-general on 24 October 1862. In February 1864 he was appointed to a Royal Commission formed to inquire into the best mode of realizing the value of booty of war. He became Governor of Malta in 1867 and was promoted to full general on 19 November 1870.

Grant was also colonel of the 104th Regiment of Foot, of the 78th (Highlanders) Regiment of Foot and then of the Royal Horse Guards. He was placed on the retired list on 1 October 1877 and promoted to field marshal on 24 June 1883.

Grant also served as governor of the Royal Hospital Chelsea from February 1874 until his death there on 28 March 1895. He is buried in Brompton Cemetery, London. A memorial plaque to Grant can be found in Duthil Old Parish Church and Churchyard, just outside the village of Duthil, Inverness-shire, which now also serves as a Clan Grant Centre.

Honours
Grant's honours included:
Knight Grand Cross of the Order of the Bath (GCB) – 1 March 1861 (KCB – 2 January 1857; CB – 3 April 1846)
Knight Grand Cross of the Order of St Michael and St George (GCMG) – January 1868

Family
In 1832 Grant married Jane Anne Fraser-Tytler; they had two children, Alexander Charles Grant and then Aldourie Patrick Grant. Following the death of his first wife, he married Frances Maria Gough, daughter of Field Marshal Hugh Gough, 1st Viscount Gough, in 1844: they had five children (four sons and a daughter).

References

Sources

External links

 

|-

|-
 

|-

|-

|-

|-

 

1804 births
1895 deaths
Scottish military personnel
British military personnel of the First Anglo-Sikh War
British military personnel of the Second Anglo-Sikh War
British military personnel of the Indian Rebellion of 1857
Knights Grand Cross of the Order of St Michael and St George
Knights Grand Cross of the Order of the Bath
British Commanders-in-Chief of India
British field marshals
Burials at Brompton Cemetery
Governors and Governors-General of Malta
British East India Company Army officers
British military personnel of the Gwalior Campaign
Royal Horse Guards officers
People from Badenoch and Strathspey